Coleophora psammodes is a moth of the family Coleophoridae.

The larvae feed on Carxylon orientale. They feed on the generative organs of their host plant.

References

psammodes
Moths described in 1989